The Ilsung, Ilsung or Illsung family was a patrician family from Augsburg in Germany. One of its branches rose to the rank of freiherr. It had two branches, the "Ilsung auf dem Stein", which died out in 1409, and the "Ilsung bei St. Johann" or "Ilsung von Tratzberg", which survived after that date.

History of Augsburg
German-language surnames